Ditrigona fasciata is a moth in the family Drepanidae. It was described by George Hampson in 1893. It is found in Sikkim, India.

References

Moths described in 1893
Drepaninae
Moths of Asia